Pierre Fichet (10 August 1927 – 8 January 2007) was a French painter.

Biography 
Pierre Fichet belongs to the second generation of post second world war abstract painters and is a Lyrical Abstraction artist. His first abstract work was in 1947.

In 1952: first exhibition at la maison des Beaux-arts of Paris.

In 1954: first exhibition of an abstract work at galerie Arnaud in Paris.

In 1959, becomes an observer member of GIAP groupe international d'architecture prospective created by Michel Ragon with Yona Friedman, Paul Maymont, Georges Patrix and Nicolas Schöffer.

His funeral was held on 13 January 2007 at Saint-Léonard's church in Croissy-sur-Seine (Yvelines,  France).

References

1927 births
2007 deaths
20th-century French painters
20th-century French male artists
French male painters
21st-century French painters
21st-century French male artists